Brandy Norwood, an American singer, songwriter and actress, has released various music videos. She first appeared in the music video for her debut single "I Wanna Be Down (1994). The Keith Ward-directed clip won the Billboard Music Award for Best New Clip, R&B/Urban. A second version, shot alongside female rappers MC Lyte, Queen Latifah, and Yo-Yo for the Human Rhythm Hip Hop Remix of "I Wanna Be Down", earned Norwood her first MTV Video Music Award nomination in the Best Rap Video at the 1995 ceremony, and received Billboard Music Award and Billboard Music Video Award nods. Norwood's video for follow-up "Baby", a collaboration with director Hype Williams, garnered a Best Choreography nomination at the 1995 MTV Video Music Awards. Other videos from the album included for the singles "Best Friend", and "Brokenhearted".

In 1995, Norwood contributed the song "Sittin' Up in My Room" to the soundtrack of the film Waiting to Exhale (1995). Its accompanying video was nominated for Best Video from a Film at the 1996 MTV Awards. Her second album Never Say Never (1998), was preceded by the music video for "The Boy Is Mine" with fellow R&B singer Monica, which was nominated for several awards, including two MTV Video Music Awards for including Video of the Year and Best R&B Video. The video for single "Have You Ever?", directed by Kevin Bray, received another Best R&B Video nomination at the 1999 MTV Video Music Awards. Never Say Never produced several more music videos, including visuals for "Top of the World", and "Almost Doesn't Count", as well as "U Don't Know Me (Like U Used To)" and its remix with female rappers Shaunta and Da Brat. 

In 2002, the highly animated, futuristic Dave Meyers-directed video for "What About Us?", the lead single from Norwood's third album Full Moon (2002), was nominated for the Viewer's Choice Award. Filmed several weeks before the birth of her daughter Sy'rai, a heavily pregnant Norwood produced one more clip from Full Moon for its title track. The release of Norwood's fourth album Afrodisiac (2004) was preceded by the music video for the single "Talk About Our Love". Norwood re-teamed with director Dave Meyers to work on the visuals which earned her another Best R&B Video at the MTV Video Music Awards. Directors Jake Nava and Matthew Rolston were consulted to work with Norwood on the videos for the singles "Who Is She 2 U" and "Afrodisiac".

Music videos

1990s

2000s

2010s

2020s

See also 
 Brandy Norwood discography
 List of Brandy Norwood songs

References

External links 
 ForeverBrandy.com — official website
 
 

Norwood, Brandy
Videography